Peter Rull Jr. (born 23 November 1945) is a Hong Kong sports shooter. He competed in the men's 50 metre rifle, prone event at the 1984 Summer Olympics.

References

External links
 

1945 births
Living people
Hong Kong male sport shooters
Olympic shooters of Hong Kong
Shooters at the 1984 Summer Olympics
Place of birth missing (living people)
Shooters at the 1986 Asian Games
Shooters at the 1990 Asian Games
Asian Games competitors for Hong Kong